The Ye River is a river of Burma. It has its source in the Tenasserim Hills and drains into the Andaman Sea along the Mon State coast. Wa Kyun is an island located 3 kilometres west-northwest of the mouth of the Ye River. The Ye River flows through the eastern part of the town of Ye town.

See also
List of rivers of Myanmar

References

External links

BNI 7 July 2006 - Child and two women washed away by flooded Ye river

Rivers of Myanmar